Pamela Chardene Mouele-Mboussi (born May 7, 1988 in Brazzaville) is a Congolese long and triple jumper. Mouele-Mboussi represented the Republic of the Congo at the 2008 Summer Olympics in Beijing, where she carried the nation's flag for her team during the opening ceremony. Mouele-Mboussi competed for the women's long jump, where she placed thirty-fifth overall in the qualifying rounds, with a national record-breaking jump of 6.06 metres.

Mouele-Mboussi also set a personal best of 11.87 m for the triple jump at the 2007 All-Africa Games in Algiers, Algeria.

References

External links

NBC 2008 Olympics profile

Republic of the Congo female athletes
Female long jumpers
Female triple jumpers
Living people
Sportspeople from Brazzaville
Olympic athletes of the Republic of the Congo
Athletes (track and field) at the 2008 Summer Olympics
1988 births
Republic of the Congo long jumpers
Republic of the Congo triple jumpers
Athletes (track and field) at the 2007 All-Africa Games
African Games competitors for the Republic of the Congo